Ilex hemiepiphytica is a plant species known only from Costa Rica.

Ilex hemiepiphytica is a tree up to 18 m tall, sometimes epiphytic when young (unusual in the genus). Leaves are thick and leathery, green above, olive or yellow-green below, elliptic to ovate, up to 13 cm long. Leaf margins are toothed with a spine at the tip of each tooth. Flowers are greenish to white, borne in small groups of the axils of the leaves. Fruits are spherical, red or purple, about 4 mm in diameter.

References

Flora of Costa Rica
hemiepiphytica
Epiphytes